Weird Western Tales is a Western genre comics anthology published by DC Comics from June–July 1972 to August 1980. It is best known for featuring the adventures of Jonah Hex until #38 (Jan.–Feb. 1977) when the character was promoted to his own eponymous series. Scalphunter then took Hex's place as the featured character in Weird Western Tales.

Publication history

Original series
The original title ran for eight years and 59 issues. It started with issue #12 (June–July 1972), continuing the numbering from the second volume of All-Star Western two issues after the first appearance of Jonah Hex. The title's name was partially inspired by the sales success of Weird War Tales, and signaled the loosening standards of the outdated Comics Code Authority.

When Jonah Hex received his own eponymous series, he was replaced as the lead feature of Weird Western Tales by Scalphunter as of issue #39 (March–April 1977). The character Cinnamon was introduced in issue #48 (Sept.–Oct. 1978) by writer Roger McKenzie and artist Dick Ayers. The final issue was #70 (August 1980).

Revival
Weird Western Tales was revived in 2001 as a four-issue limited series. This series had no relation to the earlier title, instead featuring a series of one-shot Western-based stories.

Blackest Night
A one-shot revival of the series utilizing the original numbering #71 (March 2010) was published as a tie-in to the Blackest Night limited series.

Collected editions 
 Showcase Presents: Jonah Hex
 Volume 1 includes Weird Western Tales #12–14 and 16–33, 528 pages, November 2005, 
 Volume 2 includes Weird Western Tales  #34–38, 544 pages, March 2014,

See also
High Moon
Weird West, the cross-genre.

References

External links
 
 
 Weird Western Tales and Weird Western Tales vol. 2 at Mike's Amazing World of Comics

1972 comics debuts
1980 comics endings
2001 comics debuts
2001 comics endings
2010 comics debuts
2010 comics endings
Comic book limited series
Comics anthologies
Comics by Arnold Drake
Comics by Gerry Conway
Comics by Howard Chaykin
Comics by Michael Fleisher
Comics by Neal Adams
Comics magazines published in the United States
DC Comics one-shots
DC Comics titles
Defunct American comics
Fantasy comics
Horror comics
Jonah Hex
Western (genre) comics